Zegnak, from the house of Shervashidze, or Chachba, was a prince of the Principality of Abkhazia from circa 1665 to 1700. After Zegnak's death, the Principality of Abkhazia was divided amongst his sons, with his eldest son Rostom Prince of the rump Principality in Bzyb and the separate duchies of Abzhua and Samurzakhano falling to his other sons Jikeshia and Kvapu.

References

 Georgian State (Soviet) Encyclopedia. 1983. Book 10. p. 689.

Princes of Abkhazia